Diego de Astor  was a 17th-century Spanish engraver from Toledo. He studied under Domenico Theotocopuli, and in 1606 engraved, under his superintendence, a 'St. Francis,' after Nic. de Vargas. Astor was engraver to the Mint of Segovia, and was also employed to engrave the royal seals. Of his plates we may notice the titlepage to Colmenares' Historia de Segovia (Madrid, 1640), and a series of plates of the first documented manual alphabet for the purpose of deaf education in Bonet's book  ("Summary of the letters and the art of teaching speech to the mute") .

Notes

References
 

Year of birth unknown
Year of death unknown
People from Toledo, Spain
17th-century Spanish people
17th-century engravers
Spanish engravers